Cheonggyesan is a mountain in Gyeonggi-do, South Korea. Its area extends over the county of Yangpyeong.

See also
List of mountains in Korea

Notes

References

Mountains of South Korea
Mountains of Gyeonggi Province
Yangpyeong County